is an input method published by Google for the entry of Japanese text on a computer. Since its dictionaries are generated automatically from the Internet, it supports typing of personal names, Internet slang, neologisms and related terms.

Google also releases an open-source version without stable releases or quality assurance under the name mozc. As it is open source, it can be used on Linux-based systems, whereas Google Japanese Input is limited to Windows, MacOS, and ChromeOS. It does not use Google's closed-source algorithms for generating dictionary data from online sources.

See also
Google IME
Google Pinyin

References

External links
 

Japanese Input
Input methods
Japanese-language computing
2009 software